Anya Krugovoy Silver (December 22, 1968 – August 6, 2018) was an American poet. She won a Guggenheim fellowship, and a Georgia Author of the Year Award.

Biography 
Silver was born in 1968 in Media, Pennsylvania, but raised in Swarthmore, and graduated from Haverford College, and Emory University. She then became a professor at Mercer University. Her work has appeared in The Christian Century, among other publications.

In 2004, Silver was pregnant and teaching at Mercer University when she was diagnosed with inflammatory breast cancer. She gave birth to son Noah and had a mastectomy. The cancer remained, and her coping with it, along with her son and husband, intensified her poetry.

Silver died at age 49 in Macon, Georgia, on August 6, 2018.

Works 
''Scattered at Sea'', Penguin/Penguin Random House, 
The Ninety-Third Name of God, Baton Rouge : Louisiana State University Press, 2010. , 
I watched you disappear, Baton Rouge, Louisiana : Louisiana State University Press, 2014. , 
From Nothing, Baton Rouge : Louisiana State University Press, 2016. , 
Second bloom : poems, Eugene, OR: Cascade Books, 2017. ,

References

External links 

Anya Silver page and poem at the Academy of American Poets
Interview with Anya Krugovoy Silver

1968 births
2018 deaths
American women poets
Haverford College alumni
People from Delaware County, Pennsylvania
Emory University alumni
Mercer University faculty
Deaths from breast cancer
American women academics
21st-century American poets
21st-century American women writers